Secret Omen is the fourth album by the funk band Cameo, released in 1979. It was their first of 9 albums, and first of 5 consecutive albums, to be certified gold in the US for sales of over 500,000 copies.

Track listing
 "Energy" – 4:21 (Larry Blackmon)
 "I Just Want to Be" – 5:16 (Larry Blackmon, Gregory Johnson)
 "Find My Way" – 9:18 (Johnny Melfi)
 "Macho" – 5:04 (Larry Blackmon, Tomi Jenkins, Nathan Leftenant)
 "The Rock" – 3:56 (Larry Blackmon)
 "Sparkle" – 4:49 (Larry Blackmon, Anthony Lockett)
 "New York" – 4:57 (Larry Blackmon, Anthony Lockett, Aaron Mills)

Personnel
Larry Blackmon - lead vocals, drums, percussion
 Gregory Johnson - keyboards, piano, vocals
Aaron Mills - bass guitar, percussion, backing vocals
Damon Mendes - percussion 
Anthony Lockett - lead guitar, rhythm guitar, percussion, lead vocals, backing vocals
Fred Wells - guitar
Randy Stern - keyboards
Arnett Leftenant - tenor saxophone, percussion, backing vocals
Nathan Leftenant, Arthur Young - trumpet
Carl Harleston - trombone
Seldon Powell, George Marge - flute
Angel Allende - conga
Tomi Jenkins, Wayne Cooper - vocals
Irving Spice's Strings - strings

Charts

Singles

References

External links
 Secret Omen at Discogs

Cameo (band) albums
1979 albums